Janardhanavaram is a village in Krishna district of the Indian state of Andhra Pradesh. It is located in Chatrai mandal of Nuzvid revenue division.

References 

Villages in Krishna district